Cimarron Municipal Schools is a school district headquartered in Cimarron, New Mexico.

Located in Colfax County, the district includes Cimarron, Angel Fire, and Eagle Nest.

It operates three schools: Cimarron Elementary-Middle School, Eagle Nest Elementary-Middle School, and Cimarron High School.

History

In 1983 32 students from Red River, a community in the Questa School District, went to Cimarron Municipal Schools, with 22 going to the Eagle Nest elementary school and 10 to the Cimarron secondary school.

In 1996 construction work was done in several of the district's schools.

In 1997 and in 1998 the enrollment count was 672.

References

External links
 
School districts in New Mexico
Education in Colfax County, New Mexico